A Good Day is the major label debut album by American singer–songwriter Priscilla Ahn. The album was released June 10, 2008 on Blue Note Records.

Track listing
All songs written by Priscilla Ahn except where noted.

iTunes bonus track

Japan bonus track

Vinyl bonus tracks

References

External links
[ Track listing according to Billboard.com]

2008 albums
Priscilla Ahn albums
Blue Note Records albums